The Right of Way is a 1931 American pre-Code film directed by Frank Lloyd and produced and distributed by First National Pictures. It stars Conrad Nagel and Loretta Young. The story was filmed previously in 1915 and in 1920.

Cast

Preservation status
A copy of The Right of Way is preserved at the Library of Congress.

References

External links

1931 films
1931 romantic drama films
American romantic drama films
American black-and-white films
Films based on Canadian novels
Films based on works by Gilbert Parker
Films directed by Frank Lloyd
First National Pictures films
Remakes of American films
Sound film remakes of silent films
1930s English-language films
1930s American films
Films with screenplays by Francis Edward Faragoh